Abdul Majeed (Dhivehi: އަލްއަމީރު އަބްދުލްމަޖީދު ރައްނަބަނޑޭރި ކިލެގެފާނު) (or Al Ameeru Abdul Majeed Rannabandeyri Kilegefaanu) (29 August 1873 – 21 February 1952) served as Sultan of the Maldives from 1944 to 1952. At the time, the Maldives were a British protectorate. Didi is recognized a reformer and has been described as "the father of the modern Maldives".

He was fluent in Dhivehi, Urdu, English, Arabic and Sinhalese. Didi spent most of his life in Egypt. He served as the Vice Prime Minister during his father's time. He served as the Prime Minister of Sultan Muhammad Shamsuddeen III from 1926 to 1932. During his own reign, his son Prince Hassan Fareed Didi exerted significant control over the government through the Executive Council. After his death, the Maldives proclaimed its first short lived republican government under the pro-socialist president Muhammad Amin Didi. He also designed the flag of Maldives.

Sultan Majeed Didi died on 21 February 1952 in Ceylon. The first Maldivian school, Majeediyya School, was named after him.

References

1873 births
1952 deaths
20th-century sultans of the Maldives
Prime Ministers of the Maldives
Flag designers